Scuderia Serenissima and Scuderia SSS Republica di Venezia were names used by Giovanni Volpi to enter his own cars in Formula One  and sports car racing in the early 1960s.

Scuderia Serenissima was an auto racing team in the early 1960s. Funded by Giovanni Volpi, Serenissima used Ferraris to much success until the founder financed the exiled Ferrari company, ATS. Thereafter, Enzo Ferrari would no longer sell his cars to Serenissima, so the company turned to De Tomaso, ATS, and Maserati. Volpi, and thus Serenissima, halted automobile operations in 1970.

Formula One

In 1961, Scuderia Serenissima entered the Formula One World Championship. They first entered a Cooper T51 for Maurice Trintignant at the 1961 Monaco Grand Prix, where he finished seventh. In Belgium, Trintignant retired on lap 23 with a broken gearbox after having qualified his car in 19th place. At the 1961 French Grand Prix, Scuderia Serenissima entered two cars. Again the Cooper for Trintignant and a De Tomaso for Giorgio Scarlatti. Trintignant finished in 13th place while Scarlatti retired on lap 15 when his engine broke down. At the German Grand Prix Trintignant retired on lap 12 when his engine broke down. In the 1961 Italian Grand Prix, Scuderia Serenissima again entered two cars, the Cooper for Trintignant and a De Tomaso for Nino Vaccarella. Trintignant finished the race in ninth place and Vaccarella retired on lap 13 when his engine broke down. In 1962, now called Scuderia SSS Republica di Venezia, they entered cars for Nino Vaccarella. In Monaco, Vaccarella failed to qualify for the race. Three races later in Germany, Vaccarella finished in 15th place. At the last race for the Scuderia in Italy Vaccarella finished in 9th place. In 1966 Serenissima supplied engines to McLaren. And at the 1966 British Grand Prix Bruce McLaren finished in sixth place, scoring one World Championship point.

Sports car racing

In 1963, Volpi began developing his own prototype GT car, the Jungla GT. It used a new V8 engine, designed by Alberto Massimino, with closed bodywork by Francesco Salomone (built by Gran Sport). A later open version was built by Fantuzzi. Also in 1968, Volpi gave some attention to the idea of building a serious GT car, this time with the help of Ghia Studios, came to be known as the Ghia coupe, a one-off car fitted with a 3.0L Alf Francais M176 V8.

Complete Formula One World Championship results

As a constructor
(key)

As an engine supplier
(key)

Bibliography 

 Michael John Lazzari - Giovanni Faoro. Scuderia Serenissima, Cove Edition, 2018, ISBN 978-88-940667-1-5

References

External links
 History of the Serenissima Ghia Coupé (1968)

Defunct motor vehicle manufacturers of Italy
Ferrari
Formula One entrants
Italian auto racing teams
Formula One engine manufacturers
24 Hours of Le Mans teams